Munglimane Mariappa Bhat (27 July 1906 – 21 March 1980) was a Kannada scholar, linguist and lexicographer who served as Head of the Kannada department of the University of Madras from 1959 to 1966. He also served as Principal of the Oriental Manuscripts Library and was one of the founders of Karnataka Sangha Chennai. In 1971, Bhat published a revised edition of Ferdinand Kittel's Kannada-English dictionary.

Early life and education 

Bhat was born on 27 July 1906 at Kabaka in the South Canara district of Madras Presidency as the oldest of three sons of Govinda Bhat and Kaveri Amma. After his schooling in the village, in 1925, Bhat joined St. Aloysius College and obtained his B. A. in Kannada in 1928. After obtaining his M. A. in 1930, Bhat worked at Hoskote before joining the University of Madras as lecturer in 1937.

Works 

 
 
 

1906 births
1980 deaths
Indian lexicographers
20th-century Indian linguists
Kannada people
Academic staff of the University of Madras
People from Dakshina Kannada district
Scholars from Karnataka
20th-century lexicographers